Jovan Petrović may refer to:

Jovan Monasterlija (1660s–1706), Austrian officer and Commander of Serbian Militia 
Jovan Kursula (1768–1813), Serbian revolutionary
Jovan Petrović (fl. 1932), designer of Zmaj aircraft
Jovan Petrović (general) (1843–1902), Serbian minister of defence